Jesse Dudas (born March 31, 1988) is a Canadian-Hungarian professional ice hockey defenceman who currently plays for HC Vítkovice Ridera of the Czech Extraliga (ELH). He is of Hungarian descent. He was selected by the Columbus Blue Jackets in the sixth round, 159th overall, of the 2006 NHL Entry Draft.

Dudas made his international debut and played for Hungary at the 2016 IIHF World Championship in Russia.

References

External links

1988 births
Living people
Bloomington Blaze (CHL) players
Bloomington PrairieThunder players
Canadian expatriate ice hockey players in the United States
Canadian ice hockey defencemen
Charlotte Checkers (1993–2010) players
Columbus Blue Jackets draft picks
Corpus Christi Icerays players
HC TPS players
HC Vítkovice players
Hungarian ice hockey defencemen
Ice hockey people from Alberta
Lethbridge Hurricanes players
MAC Budapest players
Orlando Solar Bears (ECHL) players
Prince George Cougars players
Regina Pats players
Sportspeople from St. Albert, Alberta
Swift Current Broncos players
Wichita Thunder players
Canadian people of Hungarian descent
Canadian expatriate ice hockey players in Finland
Canadian expatriate ice hockey players in the Czech Republic
Canadian expatriate ice hockey players in Poland
Canadian expatriate ice hockey players in Germany
Citizens of Hungary through descent
Hungarian expatriate sportspeople in Finland
Hungarian expatriate sportspeople in the Czech Republic
Hungarian expatriate sportspeople in Poland
Hungarian expatriate sportspeople in Germany
DVTK Jegesmedvék players
Rostock Piranhas players
TH Unia Oświęcim players
Hungarian expatriate ice hockey people